Armenian battalions refer to military units formed by Armenian volunteer conscripts, mostly fighting against the Ottoman forces:

 1912-13, Balkan Wars, an auxiliary battle group in Bulgarian Army. (Andranik Ozanian#Balkan Wars)
 1914-17, World War I, Armenian volunteer units were employed in the Russian Imperial Army 
 1914-17, World War I, Armenian volunteer units were employed in the Egyptian Expeditionary Force of British Army.
 1916-20, World War I, French Armenian Legion were employed in the French Army. The unit was active in Adana and Arara.
 1940-45, World War II, Armenian Legion.

Military units and formations of World War I
Military units and formations of Armenia
Expatriate military units and formations
20th century in Armenia
Military units and formations established in 1912
Military units and formations disestablished in 1945